Donald Heenan (25 November 1908 – 14 June 1961) was a New Zealand cricketer. He played two first-class matches for Otago between 1928 and 1930.

See also
 List of Otago representative cricketers

References

External links
 

1908 births
1961 deaths
New Zealand cricketers
Otago cricketers
People from Gore, New Zealand